

Flutes 

 Piccolo
 Western concert flute
 Fife
 Alto flute
 Bass flute
 Contra-alto flute
 Contrabass flute
 Double contrabass flute
 Bansuri (India)
 Irish flute
 Koudi (China)
 Dizi (China)
 Native American flute
 Daegeum (Korea)
 Nohkan (Japan)
 Ryūteki (Japan)
 Shinobue (Japan)
 Švilpa (Lithuania)
 Venu (India)
 Kaval (Anatolian-Turkic, Bulgaria, Macedonia)
 Fyell (Albanian polla) 
 Ney (Anatolian-Turkic) 
 Danso (Korea)
 Hocchiku (Japan)
 Hun (Korea)
 Palendag (Philippines)
 Panflute (Greece)
 Suling (Indonesia/Philippines)
 Tumpong (Philippines)
 Xiao (China)
 Xun (China)
 Khlui (Thailand)
 Matófono (Argentina/Uruguay)

Notched
 Quena (South America)
 Shakuhachi (Japan)

Internal Duct (fipple) 

 Almpfeiferl (Austria)
 Caval (Romania) 
 Diple (or Dvojnice, a double recorder) (Serbia)
 Flageolet (France)
 Fluier (Romania)
 Frula (Serbia, Bosnia & Hercegovina, Croatia)
 Furulya (Hungary)
 Gemshorn (Germany)
 Ocarina (South America, England, China, and various other countries)
 Organ pipe The pipes of the church/chamber organ are actually fipple flutes.
 Recorder (General)
 Tin Whistle (Penny whistle) (Ireland)
 Shvi (Armenia)
 Dilli Kaval (Turkey)

Overblown 
 Fujara (Slovakia)
 Futujara

Single reed

Alboka (Basque Country, Spain)
Arghul (Egypt and other Arabic nations)
Aulochrome
Chalumeau
Clarinet
Piccolo (or sopranino, or octave) clarinet
Sopranino clarinet (including E-flat clarinet)
Soprano clarinet 
Saxonette
Basset clarinet
Clarinette d'amour
Basset horn
Alto clarinet
Bass clarinet
Contra-alto clarinet (Eb contrabass clarinet)
Contrabass clarinet
Octocontra-alto clarinet
Octocontrabass clarinet
Diplica (Baranya)
Double clarinet
Heckel-clarina
Heckelphone-clarinet

Hornpipe
Launeddas (Sardinia)
Manzello
Mijwiz (Arabic nations)
Octavin
Pibgorn
Saxophone 
Soprillo
Sopranino saxophone
Soprano saxophone
Mezzo-soprano saxophone
Alto saxophone
Tenor saxophone
C melody saxophone
Baritone saxophone
Bass saxophone
Contrabass saxophone
Subcontrabass saxophone
Tubax
Double contrabass saxophone
Sipsi
Sneng
Stritch
Tárogató (after 1890)
Xaphoon
Zhaleika

Double-reed 

 Algaita
 Aulos
 Balaban (instrument) (Azerbaijan)
 Bassanelli
 Bassoon
Soprano bassoon
Tenoroon
Contrabassoon
 Biforaers (Sicily)
 Bombardeers (France)
 Catalan shawm
 Cromorne (French baroque, different from the crumhorn)
 Contra Forte
 Duduk (Armenia)
 Dulcian
 Dulzaina (Spain)
 Heckelphone
Piccolo heckelphone
Hichiriki (Japan)
Kèn bầu (Vietnam)
 Mizmar (Arabic nations)
 Nadaswaram 
 Oboe 
 Piccolo oboe
 Oboe d'amore
 Cor anglais (i.e. English horn)
 Oboe da caccia
 Bass oboe
 Contrabass oboe

Piri (Korea)
Pommer (Europe)
 Rackett (Europe)
 Reed contrabass/Contrabass à anche
 Rhaita (North Africa)
 Rothphone
 Sarrusophone (but often played with single reed mouthpiece)
 Shawm (Schalmei)
 Sopilas (Croatia)
 Sornas (Persia)
 Suona (China)
 Surnayers (Iran)
 Taepyeongso (Korea)
 Tárogatós (Hungary; up to about the 18th century)
 Tromboon
 Trompeta china (Cuba)
 Zurla (Macedonia)
 Zurna

Capped 
 Bagpipes (see Types of bagpipes)
 Cornamuse
 Crumhorn
 Hirtenschalmei
 Kortholt
 Rauschpfeife

Triple reed 
 Hne (Myanmar)

Quadruple reed 
 Pi (Thailand)  
 Shehnai (India)
 Sralai (Cambodia)

 
Woodwind blah